Fridolin Wenger (date of birth unknown; d.1931) was a Swiss footballer who played for FC Basel.

Between the years 1907 and 1914 Wenger played a total of 65 games for Basel. He played mainly in the position as goalkeeper, but he also played out in the field as midfielder. 45 of these games were in the Swiss Serie A, one in the Anglo-Cup and 19 were friendly games. In total he scored seven goals, four of which in test games and three in the domestic league during the FC Basel 1912–13 season.

References
 Rotblau: Jahrbuch Saison 2017/2018. Publisher: FC Basel Marketing AG. 

FC Basel players
Swiss men's footballers
Association football goalkeepers
Association football defenders
1931 deaths